Guillermo Muñoz Muñoz (born 25 January 1953) was a Chilean former footballer who played as a forward for clubs in Chile and Spain.

Club career
As a youth player, Muñoz was with Escuela Industrial, Liceo de Hombres, Arturo Prat, Unión Delicias, Unión San Felipe, among others, in his city of birth, joining Santiago Wanderers in 1970. At professional level, he spent two and a half seasons with Santiago Wanderers in the Chilean Primera División from 1971 to 1973.

In 1973, he moved to Spain and joined Deportivo La Coruña for a quarter of a million dollars. He stayed with the club until the 1978–79 season, making also appearances for the reserve team, Deportivo Fabril.

His last club was Unión San Felipe in the 1981 Segunda División de Chile.

International career
Muñoz made eight appearances and scored a goal for the Chile national team in 1973. He took part of friendlies, winning the  against Argentina, and the 1974 FIFA World Cup qualification.

Personal life
Muñoz was nicknamed Hallulla, as a type of slightly leavened white bread, due to the fact that his father was a baker.

In 3 August 2009, He was given the Premio a la Trayectoria Deportiva (Sport Career Award) by the Municipality of San Felipe.

In his last years, he worked as a caretaker at a company and died in 2016 due to a stomach cancer.

Honours
Chile
 : 1973

Individual
 Sport Career Award (Municipality of San Felipe): 2009

References

External links
 
 Guillermo Muñoz at BDFutbol.com 
 Guillermo Muñoz at SoloFutbol.cl 

1953 births
2016 deaths
People from San Felipe, Chile
Chilean footballers
Chilean expatriate footballers
Chile international footballers
Chilean Primera División players
Santiago Wanderers footballers
Segunda División players
Tercera División players
Deportivo de La Coruña players
Deportivo Fabril players
Primera B de Chile players
Unión San Felipe footballers
Chilean expatriate sportspeople in Spain
Expatriate footballers in Spain
Association football forwards